Lord of the Dance  is an Irish musical and dance production that was created, choreographed, and produced by Irish-American dancer Michael Flatley, who also took a starring role.  The music for the show was written by Ronan Hardiman.

Background
Michael Flatley found his first fame starring in Riverdance, but he left the show in late 1995 due to conflicts over creative control. He dreamed of, and put into action, a plan of putting together a dance show capable of playing in arenas and stadiums instead of traditional theatres. Later on, Flatley soon began thinking of rhythm patterns and steps for an a cappella number. This number would later become "Planet Ireland", the show's finale. The show took six months to bring from conception to stage. Auditions were held in the SFX City Theatre in Dublin.

Story
The story follows the character the Lord of the Dance and his fight against the evil dark lord Don Dorcha from taking over Planet Ireland. The Lord of the Dance defeats the dark lord's invasion with help from a little spirit. There is also a story with a "love versus lust" theme expressed through dance throughout the show. Saoirse, the Irish Cailín fights for the love of the Lord of the Dance against the wicked Morrighan, the Temptress. The stories are based on ancient Irish folklore and some biblical references; the title itself, along with the central musical theme, is taken from a contemporary hymn.

Synopsis (original 1996 version)

The show begins with the number "Cry of the Celts". A female troupe sleeps in a semicircle with a girl dressed in gold, known as "Little Spirit" while winds accompany the scene. Seconds later, masked figures cloaked in black and bearing torches arrive and stand as statues while ambient new age music plays. Later, the Little Spirit rises from her sleep and plays the show's theme song on a tin whistle. She then awakens the troupe with magical dust. The Little Spirit leaves with the cloaked figures as the female troupe makes their first dance. Drum beats fill in and the show's main eponymous character, known as "Lord of the Dance" appears and dances before an elated crowd before being accompanied by the entire dance troupe.

After a song by "Erin the Goddess" ("Suil A Ruin"), the Little Spirit activates a mechanical musical doll which then dances with the female troupe led by the lead female protagonist Saoirse ("Celtic Dream"). A terrifying performance of "Warriors" with suspenseful music follows, with dark lord Don Dorcha doing an introductory dance before being followed by his troupe. At the end of Warriors, the Little Spirit plays a trick on one of them. Morrighan the Temptress makes her introduction soon after ("Gypsy").

"Strings of Fire" kicks in with two female fiddlers. Later Saoirse leads the female troupe in fighting Morrighan and later changes to black inner clothing after a fight with the temptress ("Breakout"). They are then greeted by the Lord of the Dance himself and his troupe, who then dances into an a'capella number ("Warlords"). Another song by Erin the Goddess follows ("Gaelic Song")

The eponymous number of the show ("Lord of the Dance") begins with a two pairs of males accompanying a pair of females in an introductory dance before the eponymous character dances to the shows' upbeat theme. The number ends with the title character being joined by his troupe.

Performances
Lord of the Dance had preview shows at the Point Theatre in Dublin from 28 June to 1 July 1996. The show staged a premiere performance on 27 June 1996 – the video was filmed on 2 July 1996.

In March 1997, Lord of the Dance was performed at the Oscars. That November, Lord of the Dance expanded operations by forming several troupes of dancers which would tour North America and Europe. Flatley signed a contract with Disney for Lord of the Dance to perform at Epcot in Walt Disney World in the summer of 1999 and Lord of the Dance was asked back the following summer in 2000. Troupe 4 performed at the Disneyland Paris Resort in 2002 and 2003. There are currently two troupes of Lord of the Dance productions touring the world: Troupe 1, currently touring throughout Europe and Asia and Troupe 2, touring US and Canada including Europe too.

Feet of Flames
After two years of touring, Flatley created Feet of Flames, an expanded version of the show. The first Feet of Flames concert which premiered on July 25 that year, was made as a one-off performance of Lord of the Dance. While closely resembling the original show, Feet of Flames merged two troupes of the original show, totaling almost 100, and also adds an all-male choir and a live band. The show was held before 25,000 people in London's Hyde Park. The special feature was a dance solo by Flatley without music. It was supposed to be the last time Flatley danced live on stage, but a different version of the show would later go on tour in 2000–01 (only one troupe appeared on this tour). The Hyde Park show marked the last time Michael Flatley danced in "Lord of the Dance", he would go on to do the Feet of Flames World Tour, and after that, Celtic Tiger. The Lord of the Dance 10th Anniversary Party was held in June 2006.

2010 Return of Michael Flatley Reunion tour
Flatley's return to performance in Feet of Flames Taipei in 2009 marked the first step to his return in the show.

In April 2010, he announced that he would be returning to headline the Lord of the Dance show, with performances in Dublin's The O2, Belfast's Odyssey Arena, London's O2 arena, Sheffield's Sheffield Arena, Manchester's MEN Arena, Birmingham's LG Arena, Nottingham's Trent FM Arena, Liverpool's Echo Arena, London's Wembley Arena, Newcastle's Metro Radio Arena in November 2010, with dates also announced in Germany, Switzerland & Austria, the first time he will have done so since 1998.

The show did not use the original stage set design but upgraded it to a modern design consisting of seven erect rectangular screens with a set of stairs also acting as screens. New lighting was introduced and aircraft landing lights were used as stage lights to add to the effect. The show also featured updated and redesigned costumes from the original show.

The concerts in Dublin, London, and Berlin were filmed for a 3D concert film entitled Lord of the Dance 3D. Later on, the film was released on DVD and Blu-ray on 28 June 2011 under the title Michael Flatley Returns as Lord of the Dance in US and Canada, and 4 August in Australia, 12 September 2011 in the UK and October in Germany, France, Benelux and Scandinavia. The 3D version of the film was released only in Blu-ray in late 2011.

Lead dancers
Over the years, along with several troupes, the lead dancers have changed.

Original characters (1996 show)
Lord of The Dance: Michael Flatley
Saoirse, the Irish Cailín: Bernadette Flynn
Morrighan the Temptress: Gillian Norris
Don Dorcha, the Dark Lord: Daire Nolan
The Little Spirit: Helen Egan
Fiddlers: Máiréad Nesbitt and Cora Smyth
Erin the Goddess: Anne Buckley

Understudies
John Carey - Lord of the Dance
Areleen Ni Bhaoill - Saoirse
Fiona Harold - Morrighan
Cian Nolan (Daire Nolan's younger brother) - Don Dorcha

Original Band (1996 show)
Dave Keary, Guitar
Eamon Byrne, Bass
Gary Sullivan, Drums 
Máiréad Nesbitt, Fiddles
Cora Smyth, Fiddles
Liam O'Connor, Box
Ger Fahey, Pipes

2010 Return of Michael Flatley tour
These cast members were on Flatley's return tour throughout Europe and are on the 3D film which was later released on DVD and Blu-ray.

Lord of The Dance: Michael Flatley
Saoirse, the Irish Cailín: Bernadette Flynn-O'Kane
Morrighan the Temptress: Ciara Sexton
Don Dorcha: Tom Cunningham
The Little Spirit: Katie Pomfret
Fiddlers: Giada Costenaro and Valerie Gleeson
Vocalist: Deirdre Shannon

Bernadette Flynn toured with the show until 2011. Gillian Norris left the show in early 2000. Daire Nolan left the show shortly after its first run in Epcot in 1999. Mairead Nesbitt moved to Celtic band Celtic Woman. Cora Smyth toured with Flatley in Celtic Tiger until he cancelled the tour due to a viral infection. Anne Buckley performed with the show until 2001 and has since recorded a solo album.

Musical numbers

Act 1:
Cry Of The Celts - Lord Of The Dance & The Clan
Suil A Ruin - Erin The Goddess
Celtic Dream - Saoirse & The Girls
The Warriors - Don Dorcha & The Warriors
Gypsy - Morrighan
Strings Of Fire - The Violins
Breakout - Saoirse & The Girls
Warlords - Lord Of The Dance & The Warlords
Gaelic Song - Erin The Goddess
The Lord Of The Dance - Lord Of The Dance & The Clan

Act 2
Spirit In The New World - The Spirit
Dangerous Game - The Spirit, Don Dorcha & The Warriors
Hell's Kitchen - Lord Of The Dance, Don Dorcha, The Warlords & The Warriors
Fiery Nights - Morrighan, Don Dorcha, The Warriors & Their Women
The Lament - The Violins
Siamsa - The Clan
She Moved Through The Fair - Erin The Goddess
Stolen Kiss - Saoirse, Lord Of The Dance & Morrighan
Nightmare - Don Dorcha & The Warriors
The Duel - Lord Of The Dance & Don Dorcha
Victory - Lord Of The Dance & The Clan
Planet Ireland - Lord Of The Dance & The Clan

Tour dates
Michael Flatley starred in the show from 1996 to early 1998 before going on to Feet of Flames.
This incomplete list includes Troupes 1, 2,  3, and  4.

1996 – with Michael Flatley
28 June to 30 December: Ireland premiere, United Kingdom, Australia, New Zealand

1997 – with Michael Flatley
3 January to 27 November: United Kingdom, United States, Canada, Australia

1998
11 January to 10 December: England, Germany, Sweden, Finland, Denmark, Belgium, the Netherlands, South Africa, Ireland, Wales, Scotland, Austria, France, Norway.

1999
9 January to 19 December: Israel, Germany, England, Italy, Switzerland, Spain, the Netherlands, Austria, France, Portugal.

2000
26 January to 16 December: Japan, South Africa, France, United States, Germany, Argentina.

2001
21 January to 22 December: Germany, France, Austria, Croatia, Slovenia, Switzerland, Hungary, Bulgaria, Romania, Slovakia, England, the Netherlands, Japan, Russia, Estonia, Belgium.

2002
16 February to 31 December: France, Switzerland, Austria, Germany, the Netherlands, Belgium, Lebanon, England, Finland, Russia, Ukraine,

2003
1 January to 16 December: France, Portugal, Switzerland, Germany, Czech Republic, Hungary, the Netherlands, Belgium, England, Russia, Latvia, Lithuania, Poland, Slovakia, Austria, Italy, Slovenia, Spain,

2004
13 January to 19 December: Taiwan, United Arab Emirates, Germany, Czech Republic, Slovakia, Ukraine, Serbia and Montenegro, Croatia, Switzerland, France, Greece, Czech Republic, South Africa, Israel, China.

2005
12 January to 31 December: Denmark, Sweden, Germany, Luxembourg, Portugal, Czech Republic, Slovakia, Austria, Switzerland, Macedonia, England,

2006
1 January to 26 June: England, Chile

2007
Troupe One – 1 March to 22 December: Poland, United Kingdom, Austria, Switzerland, Luxembourg, Belgium, France, Norway, Finland, Sweden, Denmark, Germany, Greece

2010 – Tour with Michael Flatley – UK, Ireland, Germany, Switzerland, and Austria

2015 – Lord of the Dance: Dangerous Games had temporary shows at the Playhouse Theatre, London and at the Lyric Theatre, Broadway and two touring casts elsewhere at the same time – one was in Sydney, Australia and also in Auckland, New Zealand, the others were spread across Europe. The European tour included countries such as Romania, Bulgaria, Hungary, Slovakia, Czech Republic, Germany, Switzerland, Austria, Luxembourg, Belgium, and Poland.

2022 - 25 Years of Lord Of The Dance United Kingdom

References

External links
 Official show site
 Official site of the 3D film of the show
 
 

Irish dance
Irish stepdance
1996 musicals